Callidiopis is a genus of longhorn beetle in the family Cerambycidae.

References 

Cerambycinae